Blackwater Commercial Historic District is a national historic district located at Blackwater, Cooper County, Missouri.  The district encompasses 12 contributing buildings in the central business district of Blackwater.  It developed between about 1889 and 1950, and includes representative examples of Late Victorian style architecture.  Notable buildings include the Frady Hotel (c. 1889), Adam Schuster Building (c. 1915), Lee O'Neal Hardware Store (c. 1913), and L. F. Berry, John Smith and Lizzie Fisher Building (c. 1904).

It was listed on the National Register of Historic Places in 2005.

References

Historic districts on the National Register of Historic Places in Missouri
Victorian architecture in Missouri
National Register of Historic Places in Cooper County, Missouri